Bill Morrow (5 October 1928 – 9 October 2002) was an Australian rules footballer who played with Melbourne in the Victorian Football League (VFL).

In 2003 he was selected in Prahran's Team of the Century.

Notes

External links 

1928 births
2002 deaths
Australian rules footballers from Victoria (Australia)
Melbourne Football Club players
Prahran Football Club players